Lotta Wänberg (born 18 February 1979) is a Swedish former Olympic freestyle swimmer. She competed in the 2004 Summer Olympics, where she swam a leg in the 4×200 m freestyle relay team that finished eighth.

Clubs 
 Malmö KK

References

1979 births
Living people
Swimmers at the 2004 Summer Olympics
Olympic swimmers of Sweden
Malmö KK swimmers
Swedish female freestyle swimmers